Penzlin is a town in the Mecklenburgische Seenplatte district, in Mecklenburg-Vorpommern, Germany. It is situated 13 km southwest of Neubrandenburg, and 27 km east of Waren. In July 2008 it absorbed the former municipality Alt Rehse, in June 2009 the former municipalities Groß Vielen, Groß Flotow, Marihn and Mollenstorf, in January 2011 Klein Lukow and in January 2012 Mallin.

Sister cities
 Otterndorf, Germany
 Łęczyca, Poland

References

External links

Cities and towns in Mecklenburg
Populated places established in the 1260s
1263 establishments in Europe